Thomas Blanchard Dewey (Elkhart, Indiana, March 6, 1915 – Tempe, Arizona, April 1981) was an American author of hardboiled crime novels. He created two series of novels: the first one features Mac, a private investigator from Chicago, the second features Pete Schoefield.

Bibliography

Mac series 

 Draw the Curtain Close, 1947
 Every Bet's a Sure Thing, 1953
 Prey for Me, 1954
 The Mean Streets, 1954
 The Brave, Bad Girls, 1956
 You've Got Him Cold, 1958
 The Case of the Chased and the Chaste, 1959
 The Girl Who Wasn't There, 1960
 How Hard to Kill, 1962
 A Sad Song Singing, 1963
 Don't Cry for Long, 1964
 Portrait of a Dead Heiress, 1965
 "The Big Job" (short story), 1965
 Deadline, 1966
 Death and Taxes, 1967
 The King Killers, 1968
 The Love-Death Thing, 1969
 The Taurus Trip, 1970

Pete Schoefield series
 And When She Stops, 1957
 Go To Sleep, Jeannie, 1959
 Too Hot For Hawaii, 1960
 The Golden Hooligan, 1961
 Go Honeylou, 1962
 The Girl with the Sweet Plump Knees, 1963
 The Girl in the Punchbowl, 1964
 Only on Tuesdays, 1964
 Nude in Nevada, 1964

Other
 Hue And Cry, 1944
 As Good as Dead, 1946
 Mourning After, 1950
 My Love Is Violent, 1956
 The Case of the Murdered Model, 1959
 The Girl Who Wasn't There, 1960
 Hunter at Large, 1961

References

External links

1915 births
1981 deaths
American crime fiction writers
20th-century American novelists
American male novelists
20th-century American male writers